Robert Kett (c. 1492 – 7 December 1549) was the leader of Kett's Rebellion.

Kett was the fourth son of Thomas Kett, of Forncett, Norfolk and his wife Margery. He is thought to have been a tanner, but he certainly held the manor of Wymondham in Norfolk.  With his brother William he led the men of Wymondham in their quarrel with a certain John Flowerdew, tearing down the enclosure fences Flowerdew had erected on the Hethersett common, and having thus come into prominence, he headed the men of Norfolk when they rose in rebellion in 1549 owing to the hardships inflicted by the extensive enclosures of common lands and by the general policy of Edward Seymour, 1st Duke of Somerset, then Lord Protector. A feast held at Wymondham in July 1549 developed into a riot and gave the signal for the outbreak. Leading his followers to Norwich, Kett formed a camp on Mousehold Heath, where he is said to have commanded 16,000 men, introduced a regular system of discipline, administered justice and blockaded the city.

He refused the royal offer of an amnesty on the grounds that innocent and just men had no need of pardon, and on 1 August 1549 attacked and took possession of Norwich. John Dudley, Earl of Warwick, marched against the rebels, and after his offer of pardon had been rejected he forced his way into the city, driving its defenders before him. Then, strengthened by the arrival of some foreign mercenaries, he attacked the main body of the rebels at Dussindale on 27 August. Although Kett's men were faced with a trained soldiery, the battle saw fierce fighting and lasted most of the day: but Kett's men were ultimately defeated and Robert and William Kett were seized and taken to London, where they were condemned to death for treason. On 7 December 1549 Robert was executed at Norwich, and his body was hanged on the top of the castle, while that of William was hanged on the church tower at Wymondham. The Kett line still survives to this day.

References

English rebels
English revolutionaries
1549 in England
Tudor rebellions
1549 deaths
Year of birth unknown
People from Wymondham
People executed for treason
Executed people from Norfolk
Year of birth uncertain
People from Forncett